Antisemitism in Canada is the manifestation of hostility, prejudice or discrimination against the Canadian Jewish people or Judaism as a religious, ethnic or racial group.  This form of racism has affected Jews since Canada's Jewish community was established in the 18th century.

1800s
On April 11, 1807, Jewish politician Ezekiel Hart was elected to the Legislative Assembly of Lower Canada over three other candidates, obtaining 59 out of the 116 votes cast.  Hart refused to take the Christian based oath of allegiance and the legislature dismissed him.  Hart petitioned the legislature, saying that, while he believed that he was justified in the law in taking a seat by means of the oath used by Jews in the courts, he was willing to swear the oaths used for those elected to the assembly. After some deliberation, on February 20, 1808, the assembly resolved by a vote of 35 to 5 that "Ezekiel Hart, Esquire, professing the Jewish religion cannot take a seat, nor sit, nor vote, in this House."  The events of 1807–1809 are known to many as the Hart Affair (French: L'Affaire Hart).

On March 16, 1831, a bill was introduced in the Legislative Assembly extending the same political rights to Jews as to Christians. The bill rapidly passed both the Assembly and the council and received the royal assent June 5, 1832.

Early 1900s
In 1910, Jacques-Édouard Plamondon encouraged the public to attack Jewish storekeepers and businesses in Quebec City. The shopkeepers took legal action against Plamondon, but were awarded minimal costs four years later.

1930s–1940s
Between 1930 and 1939, Canada rejected almost all Jewish refugees from Nazi Europe, taking in only 4,000 of the 800,000 Jews looking for refuge, as documented in the book None Is Too Many: Canada and the Jews of Europe 1933–1948, co-authored by the Canadian historians Irving Abella and Harold Troper and published in 1983. The  sailed from Hamburg in May 1939, carrying 937 Jewish refugees seeking asylum from Nazi persecution. The destination was Cuba, but officials in Havana cancelled Jewish passengers' visas. Jewish immigration was strictly limited in North America, so the passengers were denied entrance to Canada and the United States.

Outbreaks of violence against Jews and Jewish property culminated in August 1933 with the Christie Pits riots; six hours of violent conflict between Jewish and Christian youth in Toronto, Ontario. Swastikas and Nazi slogans began to crop up on Toronto's eastern beaches, and Jewish swimmers were attacked.

In Ontario, many restaurants, shops, golf clubs, and resorts would only serve non-Jewish clientele and signs like "No Jews Allowed" or "Gentiles Only" were found on many beaches as well. Many Jewish people faced discrimination in employment or in buying a house or a property.

In 1934, Adrien Arcand started a Parti national social chrétien in Montreal patterned after the Nazi party. His party's actions resulted in antisemitic rallies, boycotts, propaganda and literature, and the inception of several other Nazi-like organizations throughout Canada.

Also in 1934, all interns at Hôpital Notre-Dame in Montréal walked off the job to protest the hiring of a Jewish senior intern, Dr Samuel Rabinovitch, who had graduated from the Université de Montréal. The four day strike, nicknamed the "Days of Shame",  was resolved after several days when the new intern resigned his position after he realised that the other interns refused to "provide care to anyone, including emergency patients". The hospital administration did arrange another internship post for Dr. Rabinovitch in St. Louis, Missouri, where he remained until 1940, after which he returned to Montréal and a medical practice.

In 1938, a National Fascism Convention was held in Toronto's Massey Hall.

Antisemitic residential segregation was also prevalent during the 1930s and 1940s, and was accomplished through restrictive covenants. These were agreements among owners of properties to not sell or rent to members of certain races, including Jews, or were clauses registered against deeds by land developers that restricted ownership based on racial origin. At the time, restrictive covenants could be enforced by the courts.

A 1943 Gallup poll put Jews in third place, behind the Japanese and Germans, as the least desirable immigrants to Canada.

A 1948 article on antisemitism in Canada written for Maclean's magazine by Pierre Berton illustrates this racism: Berton hired two young women to apply for the same jobs, one under the name Greenberg, and the other under the name Grimes. While Grimes received interviews for nearly every application, positions available for Grimes were "already filled" when Greenberg applied, or Greenberg's applications were ignored. When Berton contacted several of these companies, he was told, "Jews did not have the right temperament", that "they don't know their place" or that "we don't employ Jews".

Berton, during his research on Canadian antisemitism, sent two different letters to 29 summer resorts, one signed Marshall, the other signed Rosenberg. "Marshall" was able to book twice as many reservations as "Rosenberg". Some resorts did not reply to "Rosenberg", and some told "Rosenberg" they were fully booked.

1950–present
Antisemitism is still a concern in contemporary Canada. The non-profit B'nai Brith Canada monitors incidents and issues an annual audit of these events.

Ontarian university programs discriminated against Jewish students well into the 1960s.

In 1989, Alberta public school teacher James Keegstra was convicted under the Criminal Code for "wilful promotion of hatred against an identifiable group". Keegstra had taught in his classes that the Holocaust was a hoax and that Jewish people were plotting to take over the world, and would fail students who did not reproduce his beliefs in class or in examinations. Keegstra appealed his conviction, claiming that the law infringed on his freedom of expression under the Canadian Charter of Rights and Freedoms, with the Supreme Court of Canada eventually ruling in R v Keegstra that the infringement was justified and upheld the law.

On May 18, 2010, a Jewish public servant won "a major human rights victory" against the federal government after complaining that her workplace at the Ottawa headquarters of Passport Canada was poisoned by antisemitism. The federal adjudicator ruled that some of the public servant's fellow employees discriminated against her because of adherence to Jewish Law (Halakha) - notably leaving early each Friday to observe the Jewish Sabbath (Shabbat) and taking Jewish holidays - and that her bosses did little or nothing to help her. The situation escalated from antisemitic bullying at her workplace to traumatizing threats when she was accused in an anonymous antisemitic message to her superiors to be a Mossad agent. Another message that followed two weeks later read: "The Jew sucks your blood. Don't fall into her trap. You will make her go swiftly or we will make her go slowly and painfully."  The public servant launched first an internal grievance against her department in January 2007 alleging breaches of the Canadian Human Rights Act (CHRA) and the no discrimination clause of the collective agreement with her employer. The grievance was rejected the following October by the federal government. She subsequently took her case to adjudication to the Federal Public Service Labour Relations Board (FPSLREB) seeking among others damages for pain and suffering, and an admission by the government that her rights were violated. She was supported by the Canadian Association of Professional Employees (CAPE)  which stated on January 18, 2011, on its website that the decision of the FPSLREB "was a significant win on behalf of the federal government employee." This case received some attention in national and international media (such as the National Post, LeDroit, McLeans, USA Today, Mekor Rishon, Hamodia).

In November 2011 an antisemitic attack took place at the south Winnipeg high school when a teen approached a 15-year-old girl as they crossed paths near his locker and began talking to her. He pulled out a lighter and started flicking it near her head, saying, "let's burn the Jew".

On April 12, 2012, several Jewish-owned summer homes in Val-Morin, Quebec were broken into and defaced with swastikas and antisemitic messages.

According to the "2013 Audit of Antisemitic Incidents" written by the B'nai B'rith Canada, there was a decrease of 5.3% in the number of antisemitic incidents during 2013. Despite that, cases of vandalism rose by 21.8% while violence increased by one incident and harassment cases dropped by 13.9%. These incidents include antisemitic graffiti, paintings of swastikas in Jewish neighborhood, firebomb attacks, antisemitic statements, etc. Antisemitic graffiti and swastika inscriptions has been also found during 2014.

In March 2015, a Toronto police published the 2014 Annual Hate/Bias Crime Statistical Report. According to the report, the victim group most targeted in 2014 was the Jewish community, with occurrence of 30% of all the hate crimes in Toronto. The total number of reported incidents that occurred on an antisemitic basis was 52, which makes the Jewish community the most targeted population with regard to assaults.

In June 2015, B'nai B'rith Canada published the "2014 Audit of Antisemitic Incidents". Contrasted with 2014 results, there was an increase of almost 30% in antisemitic incidents. The audit showed a peak of acts during July with the onset of operation Protective Edge in Gaza. According to the report, most of the incidents (1013) were defined as "harassment", when the fewest (19) were under the category of "violence".  As in previous years audits, Ontario leads the number of incidents reported at 961, or 59% of the total.  (See section on the "New antisemitism" in Canada below.) 

According to a phone survey of 510 Canadians conducted by the ADL (Anti-Defamation League) in 2013–2014,  an estimated 14% (+/− 4.4%) of the adult population in Canada harbor substantial antisemitic opinions.

In March 2016 the Toronto Police published its annual report of hate-crimes during 2015. According to it, the Jewish population is the group most targeted to hate-crimes, especially when it comes to mischief to property occurrences. Moreover, in occurrences involve religion, most of the victims are part of the Jewish community (in 31 out of 58 cases). The report found that the Jewish community makes up only 3.8% of the religious population in the City of Toronto but was victimized in approximately 23% of the total hate/bias crimes in 2015.

In November 2019, the leaders of Israel's seven universities expressed their outrage over the University of Toronto's Graduate Student Union in Canada conflating a kosher food program with support for Israel.

In July 2019, a Jewish man wearing a kippah was assaulted by a taxi driver in Montreal.

"New antisemitism"

In 2009, the Canadian Parliamentary Coalition to Combat Antisemitism was established by major federal political parties to investigate and combat antisemitism - particularly what is referred to as the new antisemitism. It is argued that this form of hate targets Israel, consisting of and fed by allegations of Israeli "war crimes" and similar claims. Anti-Israel actions that led to the formation of a Parliamentary Coalition included boycott campaigns on university campuses and in some churches, spilling over into attacks on synagogues, Jewish institutions and individuals. Activities such as "Israel Apartheid Week" at Concordia (Montreal), York University and the University of Toronto, and boycott campaigns targeting Israel (BDS) included what some considered as "forms of antisemitism".

At York University in 2009, pro-Palestinian activists attacked Jewish students, shouting "Zionism equals racism!" and "Racists off campus!" One witness stated that the attackers started banging the door and windows, intimidating Jewish students and screaming antisemitic slurs such as "Die Jew", "Get the hell off campus", "Go back to Israel", and "F---ing Jew". The students barricaded themselves inside the Hillel offices, where protesters reportedly banged on the windows and attempted to force their way in.  Police were called to escort Jewish students through the protesters.

In 2009 antisemitic graffiti was scrawled on a Jewish memorial in Ottawa, and attributed to a pro-Palestinian group.

Leading Canadian Jewish groups such as CIJA and B'nai Brith Canada took the lead in responding, while other organisations such as the Canadian branch of the New Israel Fund chose not to play a role. In August 2012, CIJA opposed the United Church of Canada (UCC) boycott and divestment campaign, and CIJA's CEO Shimon Fogel distinguished between criticism of Israeli policies and initiatives that single out Israel for economic coercion.[14]

In 2021 a group of 517 Canadian journalists signed an open letter to Canadian newsrooms on covering Israel-Palestine that was criticized as having lobbied for an anti-Israel bias and for fuelling antisemitism in Canada while implying the antisemitic canard that Jewish people control the media on behalf of Israel.

See also
 Jewish museums in Canada
Canada–Israel relations

Notes

Further reading
 
 Montreal Holocaust Museum. (2018). A Brief History of the Holocaust. Montreal, Quebec.

External links
 Voices on Antisemitism Interview with Irwin Cotler from the United States Holocaust Memorial Museum
 "Why did Canada Refuse to Admit Jewish Refugees in the 1930s?"

 
Jews and Judaism in Canada